Rajsich is a surname. Notable people with the surname include:

Dave Rajsich (born 1951), American baseball pitcher
Gary Rajsich (born 1954), American baseball player and scout
Rhonda Rajsich (born 1978), American racquetball player

See also
Rajlich